The 2015 Fórmula 3 Brasil season is the ninth Fórmula 3 Brasil season and the second since 1995, replacing the Formula 3 Sudamericana series as the highest-profile single-seater championship on the continent. In 2015 F3 Brasil will be integrated at Stock Car Brasil event, exception for the first and last round.

Drivers and teams
 All cars were powered by Berta engines, and ran on Pirelli tyres.

Race calendar and results

A calendar for the 2015 season was released on 19 December 2014, with the category supporting Stock Car Brasil for the majority of the season. The only exceptions to this was the first race at Curitiba, which was held at the Stock Car collective test and the last round, which will be held as a stand-alone event. All races were held in Brazil.

Championship standings
Scoring system

Drivers' Championships

External links
 

Formula 3 Brasil
Brasil
Brazilian Formula Three Championship
Brasil F3